Sharofiddin Boltaboev (born 19 November 1995) is an Uzbekistani judoka.

He won the silver medal in the men's 81kg event at the 2019 Asian-Pacific Judo Championships held in Fujairah, United Arab Emirates.

In 2021, he competed in the men's 81kg event at the Judo World Masters held in Doha, Qatar. A month later, he won the gold medal in his event at the 2021 Judo Grand Slam Tel Aviv held in Tel Aviv, Israel.

He won one of the bronze medals in his event at the 2022 Judo Grand Slam Paris held in Paris, France. He also won one of the bronze medals in his event at the 2022 Judo Grand Slam Antalya held in Antalya, Turkey.

References

External links

Living people
1995 births
Place of birth missing (living people)
Uzbekistani male judoka
Judoka at the 2018 Asian Games
Asian Games competitors for Uzbekistan
Judoka at the 2020 Summer Olympics
Olympic judoka of Uzbekistan